was a poet who lived in the mid-Heian period. His father was Harumichi no Niina, a descendant of the Mononobe clan.

Very little of his life is known. In 910 he graduated from literary composition and in 920 he was appointed as governor of Iki Province, but died before taking office.

Of his works, three waka belonging to him were included in the imperial anthology Kokin Wakashū and two in the Gosen Wakashū. One was also included in the anthology Ogura Hyakunin Isshu.

References

 Peter McMillan (2008) One hundred poets, one poem each: a translation of the Ogura Hyakunin Isshu. New York: Columbia University Press.

External links
 Poems of Harumichi no Tsuraki (Japanese)
 A Hundred Verses from Old Japan (The Hyakunin-isshu): 32. Tsuraki Harumichi: Harumichi no Tsuraki

Japanese poets
9th-century births
920 deaths
Year of birth unknown

Hyakunin Isshu poets
Japanese male poets